Rebeka Kim (Hangul: , born January 27, 1998) is a South Korean former competitive ice dancer. With partner Kirill Minov, she is the 2016 South Korean national champion and placed sixth at the 2014 World Junior Championships. Earlier in her career, Kim competed in single skating. She is the 2009 and 2010 Toruń Cup novice champion.

Personal life 
Kim grew up in Vilnius, Lithuania but has kept her citizenship as Korean. She speaks Russian, Korean, English and Lithuanian fluently. In 2010, she moved with her family to Moscow, Russia for her skating training.

Career

Single skating 
Kim began figure skating at age 7 and initially competed in single skating. She won the novice ladies' title at the 2009 Lithuanian Championships. In 2009, the Korean media dubbed her "another Kim Yuna". In February 2009, the KBS Global network Korean ran a documentary on Rebeka Kim.

Ice dancing

Junior level 
In 2012, Kim began competing in ice dancing with partner Kirill Minov, representing South Korea. They are coached by Irina Zhuk and Alexander Svinin. Kim/Minov were assigned to 2012–13 ISU Junior Grand Prix events in Austria and Croatia. They missed the first event waiting for the International Skating Union to grant permission for Minov's change of country — he was cleared to represent South Korea on September 21, 2012. Kim/Minov finished 10th in their international debut in Croatia. They qualified for the free dance at the 2013 World Junior Championships in Milan and finished 20th overall.

In November 2013, Kim/Minov won the junior ice dance event at the 2013 NRW Trophy which made them the first Korean ice dance team to win an international event. They placed sixth at the 2014 World Junior Championships in Sofia.

Senior level 
Kim/Minov started their first senior season at an ISU Challenger Series event, the 2014 Nebelhorn Trophy, where they placed 7th. They received two Grand Prix assignments, the 2014 Rostelecom Cup and 2014 Trophee Eric Bompard. They are the first Korean ice dancing team to participate in any ISU Grand Prix event. At the Volvo Open Cup, Kim/Minov placed 3rd in total and they became the first Korean ice dancing team to medal at the ISU event.

Programs

With Minov

Competitive highlights

Ice dancing with Minov

Single skating

Detailed results

Post–2014

Pre–2014

 ISU Personal bests highlighted in bold

References

External links 
 

1998 births
Living people
Sportspeople from Vilnius
South Korean female ice dancers
South Korean female single skaters
Lithuanian female single skaters
Lithuanian people of Korean descent
Lithuanian emigrants to South Korea